Huslia Airport  is a state-owned public-use airport located one nautical mile (1.85 km) east of Huslia, a city in Yukon-Koyukuk Census Area, Alaska, United States.

Facilities
It has one runway designated 3/21 with a gravel surface measuring 4,000 by 75 feet (1,219 x 23 m). This replaced the former runway, which had the same designation and measured .

Although most U.S. airports use the same three-letter location identifier for the FAA and IATA, this airport is assigned HLA by the FAA and HSL by the IATA (which assigned HLA to Lanseria Airport in Lanseria, South Africa). The airport's ICAO identifier is PAHL.

Airlines and destinations

References

Airports in the Yukon–Koyukuk Census Area, Alaska